Robert Ian Williams (born 2 October 1984) is an English footballer who plays as a left back for Pike Rovers. Born in Pontefract, he has made 225 Football League appearances for Barnsley, Blackpool, Huddersfield Town, Stockport County, Rochdale, Plymouth Argyle, Limerick, Cork City and Galway United.

Career

Barnsley
Williams came through the youth ranks with Barnsley, playing over fifty first-team games. He made his debut on 5 October 2002, against Brentford. On 22 March 2007, Williams joined Blackpool on loan until the end of the season. He scored on his debut for the Seasiders, in a 3–1 win at Bradford City two days later. Williams scored the first goal in the 2007 Football League One play-off final against Yeovil Town at Wembley Stadium. The goal was part of a 2–0 win for Blackpool and saw them promoted to the Championship.

Huddersfield Town
He was set to join Huddersfield Town in July 2007 before sustaining a hairline fracture to his shin. The transfer was completed the following month, with Williams signing a three-year contract for an undisclosed fee. He made his debut for the club in December at Leeds United, and scored his first goal against Brighton & Hove Albion in January 2008. He made 28 appearances during his first season with Huddersfield, and 39 in the 2008–09 campaign. The following season, he played in both legs of the League One play-off semi-final defeat to Millwall. Williams was released in the summer of 2010 when his contract expired and spent time on trial at Aberdeen.

Stockport County
Williams joined Stockport County in August 2010 on non-contract terms. He signed a full-time contract at the end of the month, and scored his first goal for the club against Barnet in October. Williams made 25 appearances for Stockport before leaving for Rochdale in January 2011.

Rochdale
Having joined Rochdale on a free transfer, Williams made his debut in March against Notts County. He was released at the end of the season after the club decided against offering him a new contract. He made nine appearances for Rochdale.

Plymouth Argyle
Williams signed a one-year contract with Plymouth Argyle in July 2011. He made his debut in a 1–1 draw at Shrewsbury Town in August, and scored his first goal for the club in a 2–0 win against Macclesfield Town in September. In his first season, Williams made 30 appearances in league and cup competition, scoring two goals. Williams signed a new one-year contract in June 2012, and began the new season with three goals in his first five appearances, against Oxford United, Burnley and Port Vale. A stomach injury he sustained in October kept him out of the team for two months. Williams left the club in January 2013 when his contract was cancelled by mutual consent. In his two seasons with the club, Williams played in 42 league games, made four appearances in cup competitions and scored five goals.

Limerick
In February 2013, Williams joined League of Ireland Premier Division club Limerick. "We are delighted to get a player of Robbie's talent and experience on board," said manager Stuart Taylor. Ahead of the new season, Williams said that "I'm not really familiar with the standard but the way people are talking it's looking positive."

Williams made more appearances for the Shannonsiders than for any other club.

Cork City
In July 2017, Williams signed for Cork City.

Galway United 
In January 2018, Williams signed for Galway United in the League of Ireland First Division. Williams said, "It's a new challenge. I've been at Limerick for a good few years and Cork City last year. Shane Keegan rang me a few weeks back and I'm delighted to come down to help and hopefully we can fire the team up to where it belongs." He made his league debut for The Tribesmen in their 4–1 win over Athlone Town on Friday, 23 February.

Back to Limerick
Williams returned to Limerick FC, this time as a player coach and also a coach for the U19 squad.

Honours
Barnsley
Football League One play-offs winner: 2005–06

Blackpool
Football League One play-offs winner: 2006–07

Limerick
League of Ireland First Division winner: 2016

References

External links

1984 births
Living people
Sportspeople from Pontefract
English footballers
Association football fullbacks
Barnsley F.C. players
Blackpool F.C. players
Huddersfield Town A.F.C. players
Stockport County F.C. players
Rochdale A.F.C. players
Plymouth Argyle F.C. players
Limerick F.C. players
English Football League players
League of Ireland players
Cork City F.C. players
Galway United F.C. players